is a railway and subway station in Chūō-ku, Osaka, Japan.

Lines 

 Osaka Loop Line (Station number: JR-O06)
 
  (Station number: C19)
  (Station number: N20)

Layout

Morinomiya Station layout

West Japan Railway Company (JR West) 

There are two side platforms with two tracks elevated.  Tichet gates are located only in the north.

History 
Station numbering was introduced in March 2018 with Teradacho being assigned station number JR-O06.

Osaka Metro 

Chūō Line
There is an island platform and a side platform with three tracks under the ground level (2nd basement).

Nagahori Tsurumi-ryokuchi Line
There is an island platform fenced with platform gates between 2 tracks underground, in the east of the platforms for the Chūō Line.

Around the station 
 Osaka Castle
 JR West Morinomiya Depot
 Osaka Municipal Subway Morinomiya Depot and Workshop
 Sakura Color Products Corporation

Adjacent Stations

References 

Chūō-ku, Osaka
Railway stations in Osaka
Osaka Metro stations
Railway stations in Japan opened in 1967